The Defence Medical Services (DMS) is an umbrella organisation within the Ministry of Defence in the United Kingdom. It consists of the Defence Medical Services Group, part of Strategic Command, the Royal Navy Medical Service, Army Medical Services and RAF Medical Services.

Structure
The Defence Medical Services are led by the Director General, currently Peter Homa. In October 2022, it was announced that Clare Walton had been appointed as Director General of the Defence Medical Services, with the rank of Air Marshal, to take effect from July 2023.

The Director General DMS is the defence authority for end to end Defence healthcare and medical operational capability.

The Defence Medical Services Group also has three two-star directors.
 Surgeon General and Defence Medical Director, currently Major General Tim Hodgetts.
 Director of Medical Personnel and Training, currently Air Vice Marshal Clare Walton. 
 The Medical Personnel and Training Directorate includes the Defence Medical Academy, which delivers medical education and training, and the Joint Hospital Group, which force generates hospital specialists for operational duty.
 Director Defence Healthcare, currently Air Vice Marshall Rich Withnall. 
 Defence Healthcare provides and commissions non-operational healthcare to members of the British Armed Forces. As part of the Directorate, Defence Primary Healthcare provides General Practice, Dental, Mental Health, Physiotherapy and Occupational Health Care for British Armed Forces personnel  in the UK and in non-operational overseas locations.

Role

The Defence Medical Services’ 7,000 general practitioners, dentists, consultants, nurses, surgeons, allied health professionals and medics (combat medical technicians) provide healthcare for the United Kingdom's Armed Forces. Primary Healthcare is provided by Defence Primary Healthcare. Hospital care is provided by the National Health Service and by embedded military clinicians in Joint Hospital Group units. Specialist military medical education and training is provided by the Defence Medical Academy in Lichfield. Deployed operational medical care is provided by the Royal Naval, Army and Royal Air Force Medical Services. The main centre for Role 4 hospital care is the Royal Centre for Defence Medicine at University Hospitals Birmingham NHS Foundation Trust.  There are smaller units at University Hospitals Plymouth NHS Trust, Frimley Park Hospital NHS Foundation Trust, North West Anglia NHS Foundation Trust, Portsmouth Hospitals NHS Trust and South Tees Hospitals NHS Foundation Trust.

History
There have been medical personnel supporting the Armed Forces since the creation of the Armed Forces.

Ships of the Royal Navy have carried surgeons for centuries.

Regiments of the British Army have employed surgeons to look after the health of soldiers and to take care of the wounded since their creation. Modern Regiments in the British Army are supported by General Practitioners employed as Regimental Medical Officers and a team of Nurses and Combat Medical Technicians. Specialist Medical Regiments provide dental, physiotherapy and mental health support.

Royal Air Force Stations have been supported Station Medical Officers and their primary care teams.

From March 2020, the DMS began supporting the UK's COVID-19 relief efforts following the COVID-19 pandemic in the United Kingdom. As part of Operation Rescript, the DMS contributed over half of its 6,500 personnel to support NHS hospitals and Trusts — the largest contribution to the operation from any other part of the MOD. The Royal Centre for Defence Medicine assisted with the construction of NHS Nightingale Hospital Birmingham, a temporary critical care hospital, in April 2020.

References

External links

British Armed Forces
Health in Staffordshire
Lichfield District
Medical units and formations of the United Kingdom
Military history of Staffordshire
Organisations based in Staffordshire